The Italian Space Operations Command (COS) is the joint space command of the Italian Armed Forces. It was established in 2020.

History
At the end of 2019, the General Office for Space was established within the Defence Staff. In June 2020, the Space Operation Command was officially founded and General Luca Capasso was appointed at its head.

The Space Operation Command operates military satellites of Italy, such as Sicral 1B, Sicral 2, Athena-Fidus, OPTSAT-3000 and the COSMO-SkyMed. It is also working together with the Italian Navy to convert the aircraft carrier Giuseppe Garibaldi, which was expected to be dismantled in 2022, into a rocket launch platform.

See also

 Italian Armed Forces
 Italian Air Force
 Italian Space Agency

References

External links 
 Official Website

Joint military units and formations
Space units and formations